Leslie Winn Satcher (born 1962) is a singer-songwriter based on Nashville, Tennessee. She has recorded two albums of her own, and has additionally co-written several singles for such artists as George Strait, Martina McBride, Pam Tillis, Gretchen Wilson, Patty Loveless, and Vince Gill.

Biography and career
Leslie grew up in her birthplace of Paris, Texas, United States, where she sang in local churches and schools – an experience which she lists as one of her biggest influences. In 1989, she moved to Nashville, Tennessee to pursue her dream of being a country music singer, but found a niche writing the songs for which she is most well known – including many by notable country music acts like Patty Loveless, Vince Gill, Willie Nelson, and Reba McEntire. Pam Tillis reached No. 12 on the country charts in 1998 with Satcher's "I Said a Prayer". In 2002, Martina McBride's performance of her song "When God-Fearin' Women Get the Blues" reached No. 8 in the United States, while her 2006 song "Politically Uncorrect", performed by Merle Haggard and Gretchen Wilson, reached No. 23 and was nominated for a Grammy award.

At the same time, her singing career also began to take off, following her signing with Warner Bros. Records, and the release of her first album Love Letters in 2002. This was followed by the independent release of Creation in 2005, which she has been touring to promote. Her work has met with critical acclaim, with the Texas State Legislature calling her:

[Able] to craft songs that capture the ears and hearts of music lovers and honoring her [...] for bringing further acclaim to the illustrious musical reputation of the Lone Star State; and, be it further [..] an expression of high regard by the Texas House of Representatives and Senate.

While USA Today listed her as part of a "groundswell" in traditional country and bluegrass music. Leslie Satcher continues to write and sing, after taking some time off in 2006.

In 2008, two songs she co-wrote with Monty Holmes, "Troubadour" and "House Of Cash" were recorded by George Strait.

In 2017, Leslie and The Electric Honey Badgers released the single "This Won't Take Long", featuring Vince Gill and Sheryl Crow.

Discography

Albums

Singles

References

External links
Leslie Satcher's homepage
Profile at Country Music Television
Leslie Satcher on copyright awareness

1962 births
Singer-songwriters from Texas
American women country singers
Living people
American country singer-songwriters
American bluegrass musicians
People from Paris, Texas
Warner Records artists
Country musicians from Texas
21st-century American women